Chevro Ahavath Zion Synagogue is a historic synagogue located at Monticello in Sullivan County, New York.  It was built in 1952 and is believed to stand on the foundation of a synagogue built in 1933 and destroyed by fire.  It is a small, two story brick building, three bays wide and three bays deep, with a concrete foundation and gable roof.

It was added to the National Register of Historic Places in 1999.

References

Synagogues in Sullivan County, New York
Synagogues on the National Register of Historic Places in New York (state)
National Register of Historic Places in Sullivan County, New York
Synagogues completed in 1952
1952 establishments in New York (state)